Elbow pass may refer to:
 Elbow Pass, the mountain pass between the Highwood and Elbow areas in Kananaskis Country, Alberta, Canada
 Elbow pass (basketball), one of the most difficult trick passes to execute